Farid Djahnine (born 16 August 1976 in Algiers) is an Algerian former footballer, who played most of his career for Algerian club USM Alger.

Career
Djahnine began playing club football wuth USM Alger, but enjoyed a renaissance with lower division side ESM Koléa at the end of his playing days.

National team statistics

Honours
 Won the Algerian League three times with USM Alger in 2002, 2003 and 2005
 Won the Algerian Cup four times with USM Alger in 1999, 2001, 2003 and 2004
 Runner-up of the Algerian League two times with USM Alger in 2001 and 2004
 Finalist of the Algerian Cup two times with USM Alger in 2006 and 2007
 Semi-finalist of the African Champions League once with USM Alger in 2003
 Has 2 caps for the Algerian National Team

References

 

1976 births
Living people
Algerian footballers
Algeria international footballers
Footballers from Algiers
USM Alger players
Algeria under-23 international footballers
Association football midfielders
Competitors at the 1997 Mediterranean Games
Mediterranean Games competitors for Algeria
20th-century Algerian people